Zdeněk Škromach (born 31 December 1956) is a Czech politician, who served as the Vice-President of the Senate of the Parliament of the Czech Republic from 2010 to 2016.

Family 
He is married to Miroslava Škromachová and has two children.

References

External links
  Official website
  As minister
 As MP

1956 births
Labour and Social Affairs ministers of the Czech Republic
People from Hodonín
Living people
Czech Social Democratic Party Senators
Candidates in the 2018 Czech presidential election
Czech Social Democratic Party MPs
Czech Social Democratic Party Government ministers
Czech trade unionists
Members of the Chamber of Deputies of the Czech Republic (1998–2002)
Members of the Chamber of Deputies of the Czech Republic (2002–2006)
Members of the Chamber of Deputies of the Czech Republic (2006–2010)
Brno University of Technology alumni